Holcomb is a small unincorporated community on Highway 6 in Pacific County, Washington, United States, about 6 miles southeast of Raymond.  It was founded as a stop on the Northern Pacific Railroad line and named after a company official.

References

Unincorporated communities in Pacific County, Washington
Unincorporated communities in Washington (state)